The list of V-2 test launches identifies World War II launches of the A4 rocket (renamed V-2 in 1944).  Test launches were made at Peenemünde Test Stand VII, Blizna and Tuchola Forest using experimental and production rockets fabricated at Peenemünde and at the Mittelwerk. Post-war launches were conducted at Cuxhaven, White Sands Proving Grounds, Cape Canaveral, Kapustin Yar, and on the USS Midway during Operation Sandy.

List of test launches at Peenemünde and the Greifswalder Oie
Launch Sites:
 P-VI = Test Stand VI (Prüfstand VI)
 P-VII = Test Stand VII (Prüfstand VII)
 P-X = Test Stand X (Prüfstand X)
 P-XII = Test Stand XII (Prüfstand XII)
 Oie = Greifswalder Oie, a small island used for vertical launches
 Karlshagen = area of destroyed settlement Karlshagen after air raid on 17 August 1943
 Rail = Launches from a train

Launches of A4b

Blizna test launch list

Tuchola forest test launch list

Operation Backfire launches near Cuxhaven
Under Operation Backfire, the British collected together and assembled a small number of V-2s to be fired for demonstration purposes.

Launches of captured V-2 rockets in the United States after 1945

The Upper Atmosphere Research Panel conducted experiments on US flights of V-2s.

Launches of V2 by Soviet Union
The USSR captured the V-2 production centre at Nordhausen and assembled their own V-2s. Subsequently, they moved the equipment to the USSR and developed their own copy, the R-1.

Notes and references
 The rocket designation "V" is for Versuchsmuster.

 The rocket designation "MW" is for rockets produced at the Mittelwerk.

External links
  V2rocket.guidePoland.info: V-2 rocket launches in Poland
 Zurakowskiavroarrow.weebly.com: Rocket V2 - The "Third Bridge Operation", July 1944 

 01
.V-2
V2 test launches
V-2 Test Launches
V-2 test launches
V2 test launches
V2 test launches
V2 test launches
Peenemünde Army Research Center and Airfield
V2 test launches